Love Will... is the fourteenth studio album by American country music artist Trace Adkins. It was released on May 14, 2013, via Show Dog-Universal Music. The album features collaborations with Colbie Caillat, Exile and the Harlem Gospel Choir.

Track listing

Personnel
Trace Adkins - lead vocals
David Angell - violin
The Beagles - background vocals
Mike Brignardello - bass guitar
Pat Buchanan - electric guitar
Colbie Caillat - vocals on "Watch The World End"
Jimmy Carter - bass guitar
Wei Tsun Chung - violin
Mickey Jack Cones - acoustic guitar, electric guitar, percussion, background vocals
J.T. Corenflos - electric guitar
Chad Cromwell - drums
Aly Cutter - background vocals
Eric Darken - percussion
Shawn Fichter - drums
Shannon Forrest - drums
Steve Goetzman - drums on "Kiss You All Over"
Marlon Hargis - keyboards on "Kiss You All Over"
Harlem Gospel Choir - background vocals on "Love Will"
Tony Harrell - keyboards
Aubrey Haynie - fiddle, mandolin
Wes Hightower - background vocals
Mark Hill - bass guitar
Jim Hoke - saxophone
John Barlow Jarvis - piano
Mike Johnson - pedal steel guitar
Charlie Judge - keyboards
Troy Lancaster - electric guitar
Sonny LeMaire - bass guitar on "Kiss You All Over"
Brent Mason - electric guitar
Gordon Mote - Hammond B-3 organ, piano
Steve Nathan - Hammond B-3 organ
Russ Pahl - pedal steel guitar
J.P. Pennington - electric guitar and background vocals on "Kiss You All Over"
Charles "Pevy" Pevahouse - acoustic guitar
Sari Reist - cello
Michael Rhodes - bass guitar
Frank Rogers - baritone guitar, electric guitar
Scotty Sanders - pedal steel guitar
Pam Sixfin - violin
Les Taylor - acoustic guitar and background vocals on "Kiss You All Over"
Ilya Toshinsky - acoustic guitar
Kris Wilkinson - string arrangements, viola
John Willis - acoustic guitar
Lonnie Wilson - drums

Chart performance

Weekly charts

Year-end charts

Singles

References

2013 albums
Trace Adkins albums
Show Dog-Universal Music albums